Barbara Flügel (born in Naila, (Germany)) is a contemporary German artist, designer and author who works in porcelain. She is the founder and has been the CEO of Barbara Flügel Porzellan since 1990

Life

Flügel was born in Naila, daughter of a gentleman farmer, reserve officer and highly decorated war veteran, Hans Flügel. She studied design at the Johann Friedrich Böttger Institute in Selb, where in 1986 she founded Barbara Flügel Porzellan.

Her designs attracted attention from Villeroy & Boch, and she has since become an outside designer to the company. In parallel she continues to operate her own company offering limited edition porcelain articles.

Awards and notable achievements

Flügel has been recognized with numerous awards such as the Gold Medal from the Zentralverband des Deutschen Handwerks (ZDH) and a prize for design from the Arbeitsgemeinschaft der bayerischen Handwerkskammern.

She was chosen as the principal porcelain designer for the 2008 Beijing Olympic Games.

Publications

Porcelain decorations, Barbara Flügel, Frech-Verlag (Stuttgart), 1989,  (Translated from German)

References

External links
Fluegel Porzellan Website
Villeroy & Boch Website
Design Award 2007

German designers
People from Hof (district)
Living people
1961 births
Artists from Bavaria